Isopropylamphetamine is a psychostimulant of the substituted amphetamine class. It is an isomer of propylamphetamine and was discovered by a team at Astra Laekemedel AB. The isopropyl moiety reduces the stimulant activity of the compound but greatly increases the duration of action. For this reason, the compound is not used recreationally.

See also 
 Amphetamine
 Ethylamphetamine
 Isoprenaline
 Methamphetamine
 Propylamphetamine

References 

Stimulants
Substituted amphetamines
Norepinephrine-dopamine releasing agents
Isopropylamino compounds
Secondary amines